The W79 Artillery-Fired Atomic Projectile (AFAP), also known as the XM753 (Atomic RA) was an American nuclear artillery shell, capable of being fired from any NATO  howitzer e.g. the M115 and M110 howitzer.  Produced in two models, the enhanced radiation W79 Mod 0 and fission-only W79 Mod 1. Both were plutonium-based linear-implosion nuclear weapons.
 The Mod 1 was fission-only with a fixed  yield, corresponding with the maximum fission only yield of the Mod 0

The W79 was developed by Lawrence Livermore National Laboratory, starting in 1975. Production of the different mods took place from July 1981 through August 1986. A total of 550 warheads (325 Mod 0s, 225 Mod 1s) were produced. All units were retired from active service by the end of 1992 with the last shell dismantled at the Pantex Plant in Texas in August 2002.

Design

The weapon utilized the M735 proximity fuze. It contained a dual-channel fuze system, target sensor, electronic programmer and power supply. Its design goals were to minimize overall weight, minimize structural volume, eliminate the use of potting materials for structural support, and to eliminate cable and wire harnesses. The goal of not using potting materials was ultimately not met.

The fuze was developed with an extensive test firing program and in service use would have experienced a  setback acceleration and  spin.

Gallery

See also
 Neutron bomb
 Nuclear weapon design
 List of nuclear weapons

References

External links
 Allbombs.html list of all US nuclear weapon models at nuclearweaponarchive.org
 Linear Implosion in the Nuclear Weapons FAQ at nuclearweaponarchive.org

Nuclear warheads of the United States
 Linear implosion nuclear weapons
Military equipment introduced in the 1970s